There have been three NASCAR Craftsman Truck Series races named O'Reilly Auto Parts 200:

 O'Reilly Auto Parts 200 (I-70), run at I-70 Speedway in 1999
 O'Reilly Auto Parts 200 (Memphis), run at Memphis Motorsports Park in 2002
 O'Reilly Auto Parts 200 (Bristol), run at Bristol Motor Speedway in 2006

See also
 O'Reilly 200 (disambiguation)